Matthew Jacob Leal (born February 21, 2003) is an American professional soccer player who plays as a center-back for Athlone Town.

Career

Youth
In 2016, Matthew competed in the IberCup, an international tournament. In July 2017, he joined C.F. Os Belenenses. His European Union passport makes him eligible to play for any European team.

Personal life 
He is originally from Newton, Massachusetts. His twin brother, Patrick Leal, is also a soccer player who plays for Venezia FC. He is of Portuguese descent through his father and holds a Portuguese passport.

References

External links

2003 births
American soccer players
American people of Portuguese descent
Association football midfielders
Living people
Casa Pia A.C. players
C.F. Os Belenenses players
New England Revolution players
Soccer players from Massachusetts